German submarine U-70 was a Type VIIC submarine of Nazi Germany's Kriegsmarine during World War II.

The U-boat was laid down on 19 December 1939 at the Friedrich Krupp Germaniawerft shipyard at Kiel as yard number 604, launched on 12 October 1940, and commissioned on 23 November under the command of Kapitänleutnant Joachim Matz to serve with the 7th U-boat Flotilla from 23 November 1940 until she was sunk on 7 March 1941.

Design 
German Type VIIC submarines were preceded by the shorter Type VIIB submarines. U-70 had a displacement of  when at the surface and  while submerged. She had two shafts and two  propellers.

U-70 was fitted with five  torpedo tubes (four fitted at the bow and one at the stern), fourteen torpedoes, one  SK C/35 naval gun, 220 rounds, and one  C/30 anti-aircraft gun. The boat had a complement of between forty-four and sixty.

Service history 
U-70s first and only patrol began on 20 February 1941. On 26 February she sank the 820 GRT Swedish merchant ship Göteborg, south of Iceland.

In her first attack at 04:45 U-70 damaged the 6,568 GRT British tanker Athelbeach (later sunk by U-99), and the 6,423 GRT British merchant vessel Delilian.

At 07:25 U-70 struck again and hit the 7,493 GRT Dutch tanker Mijdrecht.

Fate 
At 08:15, the British corvette  sighted U-70, which promptly dived. Until 10:30 Camellia and her sister ship  attacked five times with depth charges, then Arbutus made another four attacks. In total the two corvettes dropped 48 depth charges. Twenty-five survivors of her crew of forty-five, were picked up and taken prisoner.

Summary of raiding history

References

Bibliography

External links
 
 

German Type VIIC submarines
U-boats commissioned in 1940
U-boats sunk in 1941
U-boats sunk by British warships
World War II submarines of Germany
World War II shipwrecks in the Atlantic Ocean
1940 ships
Ships built in Kiel
U-boats sunk by depth charges
Maritime incidents in March 1941